Gary Steven Joyce (born 20 October 1964) is a former English cricketer. Joyce was a right-handed batsman who played primarily as a wicket-keeper. He was born at Frome, Somerset.

Joyce represented the Kent Cricket Board in three List A matches. These came against Denmark, the Worcestershire Cricket Board and Hampshire County Cricket Club, all in the 1999 NatWest Trophy. In his 3 List A matches, he scored 10 runs at a batting average of 5.00, with a high score of 6. Behind the stumps he took 4 catches.

References

External links

1964 births
Living people
People from Frome
Cricketers from Somerset
English cricketers
Kent Cricket Board cricketers
Wicket-keepers